The use of drones by the United States military has attracted differing public opinion both within and outside the United States.

Overview
Drones are used by the military in situations where manned flight is considered too risky or difficult. The United States Air Force has drones that range from small intelligence drones to surveillance drones and large spy planes. The drones are unmanned, but they have a pilot. Trained crew steer the craft through cameras that send back what they see.

The military began using these crafts to strike suspected militants in Pakistan's tribal areas under President George W Bush, but the use of drones has almost doubled since the Obama administration took office.

The year before the terrorist attacks of September 11, 2001, drone funding stood at around $284 million. By the fiscal year 2016, the Pentagon spent close to $3 billion on drones. Since their start 3,900 people have been killed in 422 strikes in Pakistan, where the drones are controlled by the Central Intelligence Agency. The controversy of drones stems from the American people's concern of using advanced technologies to kill an enemy in foreign countries.

Opinion in the United States 
The US public has broad, nonpartisan support for drone strikes, likely due to the perception that they limit risk to US troops. Monmouth University Poll on July 25–30, 2013 asked 1,012 adults nationwide the question "How much have you read or heard about the use of unmanned surveillance aircraft, sometimes called drones, by the U.S. military overseas: a great deal, some, just a little, or nothing at all?" 29% replied a great deal, 31% some, 25% just a little and 15% said nothing at all (margin of error of 3.1) The same group of people were asked the question "How confident are you that FEDERAL law enforcement agencies will use drones appropriately: very, somewhat, not too, or not at all confident?" 11% said very confident, 36% somewhat confident, 18% not too confident, 31% not confident at all and 4% unsure (margin of error of 3.1).

In a poll was taken by Fox News in February 2013 with a margin of error of 3, the majority of Democrats, Republicans and Independents approve of the use of drones to kill a suspected foreign terrorist on US soil. They also collectively disapprove of killing a suspected terrorist who is a US citizen on US soil using drones.

The same group of people were asked the question "Do you think the president of the United States, on his own, should be able to authorize the use of deadly force, such as a drone strike, to kill a suspected terrorist who is a U.S. citizen on U.S. soil?" This question was asked while Barack Obama was in office. The public answered by 32% of people saying yes, 63% of people saying no, and 5% of people saying they were unsure (margin of error of 3).

In February 2013, Fairleigh Dickinson University's PublicMind poll conducted a study to measure U.S. public opinion on the use of drones. The study was conducted nationwide, and it asked registered voters whether they "approve or disapprove of the U.S. Military using drones to carry out attacks abroad on people and other targets deemed a threat to the U.S.?" The results showed that three in every four (75%) of voters approved of the U.S. military using drones to carry out attacks, while (13%) disapproved.

Another poll in February 2013 conducted by the Huffington Post was more equivocal: 56% of Americans support using drones to kill "high-level terrorists", 13% support using drones to kill "anyone associated with terrorists", 16% thought no one should be killed with drones, and 15% were not sure.

A 2015 poll conducted by Jacquelyn Schneider and Julia Macdonald for Center for New American Security qualified some of this perceived support for drone strikes by giving respondents a chance to choose between drones, manned, neither platform, or both to conduct air strikes. They found that, while the American public was more likely to support unmanned than manned air strikes by approximately 10-15 percentage points, this support for unmanned was much less pronounced than previous polls suggested. In many cases the U.S. public supported air strikes from both manned and unmanned at similar rates.

International opinion 
Outside America, support for drones is far lower. A Pew Research study of 20 countries in 2012 found widespread international opposition to US drone killings. One reason for this is that there is a shortage of media coverage for drone strikes and the procedure involved with them. This can cause a sense of unease pertaining to the use of drones. The web aggregator blog 3 Quarks Daily in partnership with the Netherlands-based Dialogue Advisory Group hosted a symposium on drone attacks in 2013.

References

drone
Drone strikes conducted by the United States